Esplanade Apartments is a historic apartment building located at Indianapolis, Indiana.  It was built in 1912 and opened for business with ads in the Indianapolis Star on September 1, 1912, and is a two to three-story, "U"-shaped, brick veneered building.  It has simulated half-timbering and hipped roof with wide overhanging boxed eaves in the Prairie School and Bungalow / American Craftsman style.

It was listed on the National Register of Historic Places in 1983.

References

Apartment buildings in Indiana
Residential buildings on the National Register of Historic Places in Indiana
Residential buildings completed in 1913
Bungalow architecture in Indiana
Residential buildings in Indianapolis
National Register of Historic Places in Indianapolis